Peter Joseph O'Reilly (April 14, 1850 – December 16, 1923) was an Irish-born bishop of the Catholic Church in the United States. He served as an auxiliary bishop of the Diocese of Peoria from 1900 to 1923.

Biography
Born in the village of Moynalty in County Meath of the United Kingdom of Great Britain and Ireland, Peter O'Reilly was ordained a priest on June 24, 1877.  On July 3, 1900 Pope Pius X appointed him as the Titular Bishop of Lebedus and Auxiliary Bishop of Peoria.  He was consecrated a bishop by Archbishop Sebastiano Martinelli, O.S.A., the Apostolic Delegate to the United States, on September 21, 1900. The principal co-consecrators were Bishops Henry Cosgrove of Davenport and James Ryan of Alton.  O'Reilly continued to serve as an auxiliary bishop until his death on December 16, 1923, at the age of 73.

References

19th-century Irish people
1850 births
1923 deaths
People from County Meath
Irish emigrants to the United States (before 1923)
Roman Catholic Diocese of Peoria
20th-century American Roman Catholic titular bishops
Religious leaders from Illinois